Monique Prud'homme (born September 23, 1957) is a former Canadian handball player who competed in the 1976 Summer Olympics.

Born in Saint-Jean-sur-Richelieu, Quebec, Prud'homme was part of the Canadian handball team, which finished sixth in the Olympic tournament. She played all five matches.

References
 profile

1957 births
Canadian female handball players
French Quebecers
Handball players at the 1976 Summer Olympics
Living people
Olympic handball players of Canada
People from Saint-Jean-sur-Richelieu
Sportspeople from Quebec